Douglas Smith (born September 17, 1969) is an American former professional basketball player. He was selected by the Dallas Mavericks as the sixth overall pick in the 1991 NBA draft.

College career
Smith is a 1987 graduate of Detroit's Mackenzie High School; he played collegiate basketball for the University of Missouri, where his number 34 is retired.

Professional career
Smith played in five NBA seasons, for the Mavericks (1991–95) and the Boston Celtics (1995–96) and averaged 8.0 ppg in his NBA career. He was selected by the Toronto Raptors in the 1995 expansion draft, but was released before playing
any games .  On October 4, 1995, signed with the Boston Celtics.  He lasted the entire season in Boston, appearing in just 17 games while averaging a new career low in points per game with 1.9.  Doug was waived in July 1996 by the Celtics, ending his NBA career.

Smith was named to the All-Continental Basketball Association (CBA) Second Team while playing for the Quad City Thunder in 1998.

International career
Doug Smith also played for the US national team in the 1990 FIBA World Championship, winning the bronze medal.

See also
 List of NCAA Division I men's basketball players with 2000 points and 1000 rebounds

References

External links
 

1969 births
Living people
African-American basketball players
All-American college men's basketball players
American men's basketball players
Basketball players at the 1999 Pan American Games
Basketball players from Detroit
Boston Celtics players
Dallas Mavericks draft picks
Dallas Mavericks players
Goodwill Games medalists in basketball
Kansas City Knights players
Missouri Tigers men's basketball players
Pan American Games medalists in basketball
Pan American Games silver medalists for the United States
Parade High School All-Americans (boys' basketball)
Power forwards (basketball)
Quad City Thunder players
Mackenzie High School (Michigan) alumni
St. Louis Swarm players
Toronto Raptors expansion draft picks
United States men's national basketball team players
1990 FIBA World Championship players
Competitors at the 1990 Goodwill Games
Medalists at the 1999 Pan American Games
21st-century African-American people
20th-century African-American sportspeople